"Y.U. Mad" is a hip hop song by American rapper Birdman. The song features Cash Money/Young Money recording artists Nicki Minaj and Lil Wayne. The song was sent to U.S. Urban radio on September 20, 2011. and U.S. Rhythmic radio on October 11, 2011.

Music video 
On October 15, 2011, it was revealed the music video had been filmed in Miami and was directed by Gil Green. The video  premiered on Sucker Free on November 27, and on 106 & Park on November 28. The video shows Minaj dressed as Lil Wayne and dubs herself 'the Female Weezy', as she raps at the beginning of the song and at the end of her single "Stupid Hoe", from her sophomore album Pink Friday: Roman Reloaded. During Birdman's verse, he is seen sitting at a table, with YMCMB – an abbreviation of "Young Money Cash Money Billionaires", referring to the artists of Lil Wayne's Young Money Entertainment label – decorating the walls behind him. The video features cameos from Mack Maine, DJ Khaled and Cortez Bryant.

Charts

Release history

References

2011 singles
Birdman (rapper) songs
Nicki Minaj songs
Lil Wayne songs
Cash Money Records singles
Songs written by Nicki Minaj
Songs written by Lil Wayne
Music videos directed by Gil Green